Palaemon ogasawaraensis is a species of shrimp of the family Palaemonidae. It is native to the Ogasawara Islands.

References

Palaemonidae
Crustaceans described in 1981
Natural history of the Bonin Islands